The Sacred Heart of Jesus Cathedral Also Ciudad Victoria Cathedral Is the second building that has served as the main church of the Catholic Diocese of Ciudad Victoria in Mexico. It was designated as cathedral headquarters in 1962, to replace the then Cathedral of Our Lady of Refuge, whose temple presently boasts the rank of basilica, granted by Pope John Paul II.

The current building is quite simple. The main front is two bodies, very austere, The main arch is half a point. The second body presents the choir window. It has a tower of three bodies, with dome crowned by an iron cross. The second body of the tower houses a clock.

The plant of the temple, of Latin cross, consists of three bodies. On the cruise, the dome rises, octagonally, with lint.

The interior is very austere, the Corinthian-style striated columns stand out, and features a regular-quality neoclassical altar in wood, persuaded by the image of the Sacred Heart of Jesus

See also
Roman Catholicism in Mexico
Sacred Heart of Jesus

References

Roman Catholic cathedrals in Mexico
Ciudad Victoria
Buildings and structures in Tamaulipas
Church buildings with domes